Pandit Deendayal Upadhyay Indoor Stadium is located at Ghod Dod Road, Surat, Gujarat, India. It was built by Surat Municipal Corporation in 1998 at the cost of  21 crores. Named after the veteran Jana Sangh leader, Deendayal Upadhyaya, it was the first Indoor Sports Complex to be constructed in Western India.

See also
 List of tourist attractions in Surat

References 

Indoor arenas in India
Multi-purpose stadiums in India
Sports venues completed in 1998
Memorials to Deendayal Upadhyay
Sports venues in Surat
1998 establishments in Gujarat
20th-century architecture in India